The Frankfurt mafia was a crime group from Veles, Macedonia that was involved in the heroin trade in Frankfurt, Germany and Vienna, Austria. It was part of the Macedonian mafia.

International activity

Germany
Boris Rhein, Hessen's Interior Minister stated that the Frankfurt mafia held about 90% of the drug trade market in Frankfurt for a couple of years.

Austria
The Frankfurt mafia controlled 19 out of 24 blocks in Vienna's drug trade using intelligence methods.

The traffickers had taken control of the heroin trade in Vienna in a short period of time.

See also
 Macedonian mafia

References

External links
 Video of arrests of members in Macedonia

Veles, North Macedonia
Organised crime groups in Austria
Organised crime groups in Germany
Organised crime groups in North Macedonia